The 1924 Geneva Covenanters football team was an American football team that represented Geneva College as a member of the Tri-State Conference during the 1924 college football season.

Schedule

References

Geneva
Geneva Golden Tornadoes football seasons
Geneva Covenanters football